Jacques Aurelien Elong Elong (born 20 February 1985, in Douala) is a Cameroonian football player who formerly played for Persepolis & Esteghlal in the Iran Pro League. He usually plays in the defensive midfielder position.

Club career
He is a versatile player, able to serve in defence but also assist in goal scoring. His brilliant passing abilities have made him a regular in Persepolis, playing in the defensive midfield position. He also shoots well, especially from outside the penalty spot, though he has yet to score for Persepolis.

In 2006 Elong received an offer from Qatari club Al-Sadd, but he rejected it since he had just got a permanent place in the Persepolis team and was enjoying his life in Iran. Afshin Ghotbi, then manager of the club, also confirmed that none of his players are for sale.

Despite rumours of Elong leaving to either Spartak Moscow or Esteghlal in the summer of 2007 Elong remained at Persepolis for the 2007–08 season and has emerged as a crucial player for the team and even told IRIB television that he has no willingness to play abroad . His speech saying "I am loving Tehran, and I can not see myself anywhere else within the next 6 years at least."

Club career stats
Last update: 2 February 2012

International career
Jacques Elong Elong debuted up for the Cameroon national football team in an African Nations Cup qualifier against Equatorial Guinea on 7 October in Yaoundé, Elong Elong appeared as a substitute replacing AS Nancy's Landry N'Guémo in the 90th minute in the 3–0 victory. Arie Haan, his former coach at Persepolis F.C., gave him a spot in the national team. He has capped once for Cameroon national football team.

Honours
Iran's Premier Football League Winner: 1
2007/08 with Persepolis
Hazfi Cup Winner: 1
2011/12 with Esteghlal

References

External links
Elong Elong gets Cameroon call up

1985 births
Living people
Cameroonian footballers
Cameroon international footballers
Persepolis F.C. players
Sepahan S.C. footballers
Esteghlal F.C. players
Expatriate footballers in Iran
Paykan F.C. players
Mount Cameroon F.C. players
Slovak Super Liga players
Expatriate footballers in Slovakia
FC DAC 1904 Dunajská Streda players
Cameroonian expatriate sportspeople in Slovakia
Cameroonian expatriate sportspeople in Iran
Association football midfielders